The French Protestant Missionary Society at Paris was an early French Protestant Christian missionary society that was involved in sending workers to China during the late Qing dynasty.

References

Notes

See also
Protestant missionary societies in China during the 19th Century

Christian missionary societies
Christian missions in China